"Loading Zones" is a song by American indie rock musician Kurt Vile, released as the first single from his 2018 album Bottle It In. Though the song's title refers to Vile's bragging about his skill at parking in restricted areas without receiving a parking ticket, it is more generally an ode to his hometown of Lansdowne, Pennsylvania.

Background and writing
Kurt Vile wrote the song during the recording sessions for B'lieve I'm Goin Down..., but would not record it until more than two years later. He wrote the song as an ode to his hometown. The lines "Sure they knighted me yesterday" and "by mayoral decree" refer to his being given the key to the city.

Vile said that the song's various metaphors are very loose and "not too scientific".

Critical reception
The song was acclaimed by Rolling Stone for its "layered guitar gorgeousness" that sounds like "a meld of languid gothic-folk fingerpicking, watery strumming and some weirdly soulful talkboxy wah-wah jive that suggests Joe Walsh by way of Future". Pitchfork expressed approval for the optimistic and easily identifiable lyrics, as well as the "low-key psychedelic riffage."

Promotion
Vile promoted the release of the song by mailing fans envelopes marked "Violators" that contained fake parking tickets. Some were also placed on car windshields.

Music video
The music video was released on August 16, 2018, and features Vile driving around Philadelphia, where he was raised, eluding the meter maids in comedic fashion. The meter maids were played by American actor Kevin Corrigan and Pissed Jeans frontman Matt Korvette.

Personnel
Kurt Vile - lead and backing vocals, electric and acoustic guitars, harmonica

The Violators
Rob Laakso - bass, Farfisa synthesizer, backing vocal
Kyle Spence - drums
Jesse Trbovich - electric guitar

Additional musicians
Joe Kennedy - backing vocal
Eric D. Johnson - backing vocal
Margaret Yen - backing vocal
Farrah Katina - backing vocal
Robert Robinson - backing vocal

Charts

References

2018 songs
2018 singles
Matador Records singles